Tayozhny is a rural locality (a settlement) in Selenginsky District, Republic of Buryatia, Russia. The population was 150 as of 2010. There are 6 streets.

Geography 
Tayozhny is located 95 km west of Gusinoozyorsk (the district's administrative centre) by road.

References 

Rural localities in Selenginsky District